An Yeong-sik (1928 – 22 January 1991) was a South Korean basketball player. He competed in the men's tournament at the 1956 Summer Olympics.

References

1928 births
1991 deaths
South Korean men's basketball players
Olympic basketball players of South Korea
Basketball players at the 1956 Summer Olympics
Place of birth missing